Koropi is a suburban town in East Attica, Greece. It is the seat of the municipality Kropia. It has been home to the new training facilities of Panathinaikos football club since the summer of 2013.

Geography

Koropi is situated east of the Hymettus mountain, and 16 km southeast of central Athens. It is 8 km southwest of the Eleftherios Venizelos International Airport. The Koropi station is served by Line 3 of the Athens Metro, and the Athens Suburban Railway. Motorway 6 connects Koropi with Athens. 

Koropi is the largest settlement in the municipality Kropia. Other settlements within Kropia are Karellas to the north, Kitsi to the southwest, and Agia Marina and Agios Dimitrios further south, on the Saronic Gulf coast. It is part of Athens metropolitan area.

Historical monuments 
The church (old cathedral) of the Assumption. A wall painting monument of Georgios Markou the Argus, the great and prolific post-Byzantine ecclesiastic iconographer of the 18th century ("....La Dormizione della Madona, (1732), che si trova a Coropi dell 'Attica...."  Evangelos Andreou http://ketlib.lib.unipi.gr/xmlui/handle/ket/849)

Population history

Economy
Olympic Air, has its head office in Koropi. When Athens Airways existed, its head office was in Koropi.

Sports
Koropi hosts the sport teams Koropi F.C. (A.O. Koropi), one of the oldest Greek club, founded in 1903 and Koropi B.C. (Gymnastikos Syllogos Koropi) founded in 1980.

Notable people
 Georgios Papasideris, athlete, competed at the 1896 Summer Olympics

See also

List of municipalities of Attica

References

Populated places in East Attica